Veronica Sandra Karin Maggio (born 15 March 1981) is a Swedish singer and songwriter.

Born to an Italian father and a Swedish mother, Maggio was raised in Uppsala. After studying music and being the lead member of a band, Maggio released her debut single, "Dumpa mig" in 2006 under Universal Music. Her debut album, Vatten och bröd (2006), proved to be commercial success and resulted in Maggio winning a Grammi for "Årets nykomling" (Newcomer of the Year).

Since her debut, Maggio has released five more albums under Universal, with four of them topping the charts in Sweden. Additionally, 26 of her songs have become top-20 hits in Sweden. She has had three number one hits in Europe with "Måndagsbarn" (2008) in Norway and "Jag kommer" (2011) and "Hornstullsstrand" (2019) in Sweden. Outside of her solo releases, she has written songs for other artists, most notably "Hey Brother" for Avicii.

Biography
Veronica Sandra Karin Maggio was born on 15 March 1981 in Uppsala, Sweden, to a Swedish mother and an Italian father. She attended Uppsala Musikklasser primary school and went on to study music at Bolandgymnasiet (Boland highschool) in Uppsala and was also the lead singer of the group Solitude, with other members Daniel Fredriksson, Marcus "Gonzo" Berglund, Karl Jansson, and Kristoffer Hoflund.

In October 2011, Maggio had a son and in 2019 a daughter with Nils Tull of the band Hoffmaestro & Chraa.

Music career

2006–2007: Vatten och bröd
In March 2006, Maggio released her debut single "Dumpa mig" (Dump Me); the video for the single soon became the hit of the week on TV stations like ZTV. Her second single was the song "Nöjd?" (Satisfied?). She signed a contract with Universal Music and went on a tour in Summer 2006 as part of Sommarkrysset, a Swedish live-music program on TV4.

Maggio's debut album is called Vatten och bröd (Water and Bread). The lyrics and music were written by Stefan Gräslund, except for the rap verse in "Vi har, vi har" (We Have, We Have), which was written by rapper Kristoffer Malmsten (known as LKM).  "I started writing in English when I was really young, but I just wasn’t good enough." she said in 2016, "I was mimicking things I’d heard and I wasn’t able to find my own identity."

2008–2010: Och vinnaren är...
On 26 March 2008, Maggio released another album – Och vinnaren är... (And the Winner Is...), which she wrote and recorded together with Oskar Linnros.

In 2009 she enjoyed some success in Norway and Denmark with her single "Måndagsbarn" (Monday child) reaching 1st position at the Norwegian charts, as well as being A-listed on the Norwegian radio station NRK P3, and the album Och vinnaren är... broke into the top 40 albums list.

In 2010 Maggio worked with Petter on his new single "Längesen" (Long Time ago) from his album "En räddare i nöden" (A saviour when in need).

2011–2012: Satan i gatan
In 2011 she released the album Satan i gatan, on which she collaborated with amongst others Christian Walz and Markus Krunegård. The album was a success and reached the 1st place in both Swedish and Norwegian music charts, as did the single "Jag kommer".
During the summer and autumn of 2011, Maggio toured through Denmark, Norway and Sweden, and again in 2012 at Ruisrockfestival in Finland.

2013–present

On 4 October 2013, Maggio released her fourth album, Handen i fickan fast jag bryr mig, which is produced by Salem Al Fakir, Vincent Pontare and Magnus Lidehäll. The album includes a duet with Swedish singer Håkan Hellström, "Hela huset".

She released her fifth album, Den första är alltid gratis (The First One's Always Free) in 2016.   A critic describes it as "another pop triumph, combining pacing, urgent melodies, with uplifting, hook-heavy choruses." Maggio said in an interview:  "I really like the happy/sad combination." "There’s a lot of melancholy in it, but there’s also something euphoric… I tended to write darker lyrics because it was always nighttime. I was still in the process of playing live lots, so I sort of surprised myself."

In 2018, Maggio released the single, 20 Questions which was featured in Bergmans Reliquarium, a short film homage to Ingmar Bergman.

Maggio released an EP titled Fiender är tråkigt (Enemies are Boring) in June 2019 which consisted of the first five songs of her sixth album of the same name. The full album featuring 10 songs total was released on 27 September 2019.

Awards and recognition
Maggio has won many Swedish music awards. In 2007 she received "Årets Nykomling" (Newcomer of the year) at the Grammisgalan.

In 2011 Maggio won the Rockbjörnen (rock bear) prize for both "Årets kvinnliga liveartist" (Live female artist of the year) and "Årets svenska låt" (Swedish song of the year) which was presented by Swedish newspaper Aftonbladet.

At the 2012 Grammisgalan Maggio was named winner in the categories "Årets pop" (Pop of the year), "Årets kompositör" (composer of the year) and "Årets textförfattare" (Lyricist of the year). The latter two were won together with Christian Walz.

French artist Vianney wrote a song about Maggio titled "Veronica".

In 2020, Swedish singer Tove Lo released an English cover of Maggio's song "Jag kommer". In an Instagram post, Lo stated "This [song] is a special one for me because it's my English cover of one of my all time favorite Swedish songs, Jag Kommer, by badass queen [Veronica Maggio]. It's the soundtrack to so many of my memories. I've always been so impressed with Veronica's way with words. I could never write in swedish the way she can. It's the perfect mix of poetic, "everyday romance" and making the Swedish summer time feel epic and melancholic all at once."

Discography

 Vatten och bröd (2006)
 Och vinnaren är... (2008)
 Satan i gatan (2011)
 Handen i fickan fast jag bryr mig (2013)
 Den första är alltid gratis (2016)
 Fiender är tråkigt (2019)
 Och som vanligt händer det något hemskt (2022)

References

External links
Veronica Maggio – Interview in English, YouTube, 11 November 2013 

1981 births
Living people
Musicians from Uppsala
Swedish people of Italian descent
Swedish-language singers
Swedish soul singers
21st-century Swedish singers
21st-century Swedish women singers